Toni Duggan (born 25 July 1991) is an English footballer who plays as a winger or forward for Everton and the England national team, but is currently on a hiatus/maternity leave, after announcing her pregnancy on 27 September 2022. She has previously played in England for Everton and Manchester City, and in Spain for Barcelona and Atlético Madrid.

Club career

Everton: 2007–2013
Duggan broke into the Everton side in the 2007–08 season when the regular forwards suffered injuries. She scored the winning extra–time goal against Watford Ladies to put Everton into that season's FA Women's Premier League Cup final.

Duggan was the named the FA Women's Young Player of the Year in 2009, the England Women's Under-23 Player of the Year in 2012 and the North West Female Player of the Year in 2013.

Duggan also played in Everton's 2010 FA Women's Cup final win over Arsenal. Her form in the second part of the 2011 FA WSL season led teammate Rachel Unitt to predict a call–up to the senior England squad.

Manchester City: 2014–2017
After seven years at Everton, it was announced on 28 November 2013 that Duggan had signed with Manchester City. In August 2015, she became the first female player to receive the club's Goal of the Season award following an impressive goal against Chelsea in the Women's Super League. She was part of the team when Manchester City played in the Women's Champions League for the first time. In November 2016, Duggan scored a noted goal in City's Champions League match with Brøndby.

Barcelona: 2017–2019
Toni Duggan signed for FC Barcelona Femení on 6 July 2017. She was part of the squad that finished runners up to Lyon in the 2019 UEFA Women's Champions League Final. On 5 July 2019, Duggan announced she was leaving Barcelona after two seasons in Spain in search of a "new challenge."

Atlético Madrid: 2019–2021
On 31 July 2019, Duggan joined Atlético Madrid. On January 16 2021 she won her first trophy as an Atlético player appearing as a 2nd half substitute in their 3-0 win in the Supercopa de España Femenina final against Levante. After two seasons, Duggan left Atlético Madrid. She made 55 appearances in all competitions.

Everton: 2021–present
On 9 July 2021, Duggan returned to Everton, signing a two-year contract with the club.

International career

In March 2007, 15-year–old Duggan came off the substitute's bench to score on her debut for England Under-17s. She has since represented England at Under-19, Under-20 and Under-23 levels. She played in the FIFA U-20 Women's World Cup in both 2008 and 2010. On Duggan's 18th birthday, she scored one of the two goals in England's 2009 UEFA Women's Under-19 Championship maiden final win, against Sweden in Belarus.

Duggan completed her first cap for Hope Powell's senior team in England's 3–0 win over Croatia at Bescot Stadium on 19 September 2012. She scored her first international hat-trick in a match against Turkey on 26 September 2013. She scored another hat-trick in England's World Cup qualifying game against Montenegro in April 2014.

In 2015, Duggan was part of England's squad for the FIFA Women's World Cup in Canada. The team came third in the competition, securing the bronze medal, and were subsequently congratulated by Prince William at a reception held at Kensington Palace.

Personal life
Like nearly all of today's professional women footballers, Duggan started playing with boys – for an under-eight team known as the Jellytots. Duggan attended Notre Dame Catholic College and graduated from Loughborough College in 2010.

Duggan is an ambassador for Kick It Out, football's anti-discrimination organisation and the charity Saving Lives.

On 27 September 2022, Duggan announced that she was pregnant with her first child, and would miss the rest of the WSL season.

Career statistics

Club
.

International goals 

 As of match played 2 July 2019. England score listed first, score column indicates score after each Duggan goal.

Honours
Everton
FA Women's League Cup: 2007-08
FA Women's Cup: 2009–10

Manchester City
FA Women's League Cup: 2014, 2016
FA WSL: 2016
Women's FA Cup: 2016–17

Barcelona
Copa de la Reina: 2018
Copa Catalunya: 2018, 2017
UEFA Women's Champions League runner-up: 2018–19

Atlético Madrid 
Supercopa de España Femenina: 2020-21

England
FIFA Women's World Cup third place: 2015
SheBelieves Cup: 2019

References

External links

 Profile at La Liga 
 Profile at The Football Association
 
 
 
 

Living people
English women's footballers
Everton F.C. (women) players
FA Women's National League players
Footballers from Liverpool
1991 births
Women's Super League players
England women's under-23 international footballers
England women's international footballers
Manchester City W.F.C. players
2015 FIFA Women's World Cup players
English expatriate sportspeople in Spain
Expatriate women's footballers in Spain
Primera División (women) players
FC Barcelona Femení players
Women's association football forwards
Women's association football wingers
2019 FIFA Women's World Cup players
Atlético Madrid Femenino players
UEFA Women's Euro 2017 players